Oconomowoc is a 2013 American comedy film written by, directed by, and starring Andy Gillies.  The film follows a man who, after moving back in with his hard-drinking mother, becomes part of a T-shirt business with his friend.

Reception
The film has received universally negative critical reception, currently holding a 12/100 rating (indicating "universal dislike or disgust") on Metacritic and an 11% approval rating on Rotten Tomatoes.  The New York Times stated that the film "has one thing going for it: a running time of just 79 minutes, even if every one of them feels like an eternity."  The Los Angeles Times called the film a "shaggy underachiever", while The Village Voice stated that "all conversation and action in the film take turns amounting to nothing."  The film's sole semi-positive review came from Chuck Bowen of Slant Magazine, who posited that it "is extremely self-conscious, but in a fashion that generally serves the material" and is "an engagingly cynical ode to futility."

References

External links

2013 films
2013 comedy films
American comedy films
American independent films
Films shot in Wisconsin
Films set in Wisconsin
2010s English-language films
2010s American films
2013 independent films
English-language comedy films